Rue des Saussaies is a 1951 French crime drama film directed by Ralph Habib and starring Anne Vernon, Maurice Régamey and Aimé Clariond. It takes its name from the Rue des Saussaies, a Paris street. The film's sets were designed by the art director Paul Bertrand.

Synopsis
After her brother is murdered by a gangster posing as a respectable citizen, a nightclub singer recruits the assistance of a police detective to help bring him and his associates to justice.

Cast
 Anne Vernon as 	Jeanne Masson
 Maurice Régamey as L'inspecteur Pierre Leblanc
 Aimé Clariond as 	Cortedani
 René Blancard as 	L'inspecteur Martial	
 Marc Valbel as Brasier
 Jean-Marc Tennberg as 	Dédé le fada	
 François Patrice as 	Roger Masson
 Raymond Raynal as 	Raoul		
 Pierre Sergeol as 	Albert
 Simone Michels as Gaby
 André Valmy as 	Le commissaire Didier
 Jo Dest as 	Un agent
 Pierre Goutas as 	Un gangster
 François Joux as Le docteur
 Jean-Jacques Lécot as 	Un gangster
 Marcel Melrac as Un inspecteur
 Robert Moor as 	Le chimiste
 Charles Vissières as Le témoin

References

Bibliography
 Rège, Philippe. Encyclopedia of French Film Directors, Volume 1. Scarecrow Press, 2009.

External links 
 

1951 films
1950s French-language films
1951 crime films
French crime films
Films directed by Ralph Habib
Films set in Paris
1950s French films